Robert Reynolds Cushing Jr. (July 20, 1952 – March 7, 2022) was an American politician who was a member of the New Hampshire House of Representatives as a Democrat from the town of Hampton. First elected in 1996, Cushing represented Rockingham District 21. He served nine non-consecutive terms (previously representing Rockingham Districts 14, 15 and 22).

Early life and education
Cushing was born in Portsmouth, New Hampshire, to Robert R. Cushing Sr and Marie (Mulcahy) Cushing. At the age of 15, he spoke at the State House and argued in favor of lowering the voting age from 21 to 18.

He was raised Hampton, New Hampshire with his six younger siblings and graduated from Winnacunnet High School in Hampton. He also later served as the elected moderator of the Winnacunnet School District from 1993.

He briefly attended Granite State College, before dropping out and working a number of miscellaneous jobs across the US as well as Canada, including as a sanitation worker, a miner, and a farmworker. He then settled back in New Hampshire and took up welding and carpentry.

Political career
Cushing's first foray into civic engagement was in the 1970s, when he was involved with the Clamshell Alliance, an anti-nuclear coalition that opposed construction of the Seabrook Station Nuclear Power Plant in nearby Seabrook, New Hampshire. In June 1988, Cushing's father was murdered by a disgruntled off-duty policeman in his own house. He became involved with the trial of his father’s murderer and began advocating to abolish capital punishment. In 1998, he became executive director of Murder Victims’ Families for Reconciliation.

During the 2019–20 legislative session, Cushing led the effort in the New Hampshire General Court to approve legislation abolishing the death penalty, including successful votes in the House and Senate to override Governor Chris Sununu's veto.

On November 19, 2020, the New Hampshire House Democrats chose Cushing to lead them during the 2021–22 legislative session of the General Court.

Health and death
Cushing was diagnosed with stage four prostate cancer in 2020. He took a leave of absence as Democratic leader for health reasons on March 2, 2022, and died from the disease and complications of COVID-19 at his home in Hampton, New Hampshire, five days later, on March 7, at the age of 69. He was survived by his wife Kristie Conrad, whom he married in 1989, as well as his three daughters: Marie Ellen, Elizabeth Agnes and Grace Bridget Cushing.

References

External links

 Government website

1952 births
2022 deaths
20th-century American politicians
21st-century American politicians
Deaths from cancer in New Hampshire
Deaths from prostate cancer
Deaths from the COVID-19 pandemic in New Hampshire
School board members in New Hampshire
Democratic Party members of the New Hampshire House of Representatives
People from Hampton, New Hampshire
Politicians from Portsmouth, New Hampshire